Pierre André Pourret (1754–1818) was a French abbot and botanist who did research and teaching in France and Spain. He described and collected large amounts of plant species, especially from the Mediterranean, and amassed many species in his botanical garden and herbarium for his research. Pourret was also a pioneer user of binomial nomenclature, first developed by Carl Linnaeus.

Career
Pierre André Pourret was a clergyman, but started his botanical career earlier, working in the regions around his hometown, Narbonne. His given parish, however, was Saint-Jacob in Provence. He sent manuscripts of documented research to the Académie des sciences, inscriptions et belles-lettres de Toulouse.
During the French Revolution in 1789, Pourret was exiled to Spain. He did botanical work in Barcelona, Madrid, and ultimately the city of Ourense in Galicia. Due to xenophobia to the French during Napoleon's invasion of Spain, an angry mob drove Pourret out of his herbarium, burning many of his resources in the process. He lived an obscure life in Santiago de Compostela until his death in 1818.

Legacy
His botanical collection can be found in the School of Pharmacy at the Complutense University of Madrid, donated by the University of Santiago de Compostela.

Publications
 Pourret, P.A.(1781), Itineraire pour les Pyrénées
 Pourret, P.A.(1783), Projet d'une histoire générale de la famille des Cistes
 Pourret, P.A.(1784), Chloris Narbonensis
 Pourret, P.A.,Memoire sur divers volcans ėteints de la Catalogne, Palassou, Pierre Bernard (1823), Nouveaux mémoires pour servir à l'histoire naturelle des Pyrénées et des pays adjacents, Pau: Vignancour.

See also
Lapeirousia
List of botanists by author abbreviation
Philippe-Isidore Picot de Lapeyrouse

References

External links

 

Botanists with author abbreviations
1754 births
1818 deaths
18th-century French botanists
19th-century French botanists